Mwakibete is an administrative ward in the Mbeya Urban district of the Mbeya Region of Tanzania. In 2016 the Tanzania National Bureau of Statistics report there were 25,700 people in the ward, from 23,319 in 2012.

Neighborhoods 
The ward has 7 neighborhoods.
 Bomba mbili
 Itongo
 Ivumwe
 Ng'osi
 Nyibuko
 Shewa
 Viwandani

References 

Wards of Mbeya Region